The Independent Association of Latin America and the Caribbean (Spanish Asociación Independiente de Latinoamérica y el Caribe, AILAC) is a grouping of countries from Latin America and the Caribbean that cooperate on certain issues as a block in international climate negotiations.  The group was created in Doha, Qatar at the 18th Conference of the Parties  by Colombia, Costa Rica, Chile, Peru, Guatemala and Panama and supported by the Dominican Republic, breaking from the Group of 77 on some issues notably the level of commitments for developing countries. The group presents itself as a "third way" in the North–South, rich–poor divide in climate change negotiations.

Groupings are not mutually exclusive and some members participate in and/or with multiple negotiating groups such as the Alliance of Small Island States (AOSIS),  the Central American Integration System (SICA in Spanish), the Coalition for Rainforest Nations, and the Climate Vulnerable Forum.  AILAC has also written joint Submissions with Mexico.

AILAC member states

References

External links 
 

International climate change organizations
Intergovernmental environmental organizations
United Nations coalitions and unofficial groups
Latin America and the Caribbean